My Catman (Chinese: 捡来的猫男) is a Chinese-South Korean web-drama starring Im Si-wan, Chae Soo-bin and Kim Myung-soo. A joint production of South Korea's MBC and China's Shanghai Ulike Media, it is to stream online on Tencent's QQLive.

Synopsis 
A light hearted romantic comedy that revolves around a woman named Mi-oh (Chae Soo-bin), a mysterious man named Ji-baek (Im Si-wan) and a top star named Ho-yeon (Kim Myung-soo) and a love triangle that occurs between the three characters.

Cast

Main 
 Im Si-wan as Ji-baekJi-baek is described as the mysterious lead character.
 Chae Soo-bin as Mi-ohThe heroine that gets caught up between Ji-baek and Ho-yeon.
 Kim Myung-soo as Jung Ho-yeonThe hot top star with a kind personality that takes care of Mi-oh.

Awards and nominations

References 

Chinese web series
South Korean web series
South Korean romantic comedy television series
Tencent original programming